Gouda is a settlement in Cape Winelands District Municipality in the Western Cape province of South Africa.

The town lies some 38km south of Porterville, 14km west of Tulbagh and 61km north-west of Worcester. Prior to 1929, it was known as Porterville Road. Of Khoekhoen origin, the name Gouda is said to mean ‘antelope’. Another possible translation is ‘honey path’, ‘honey defile’. It is unrelated to the Dutch city of the same name. Notable people living in Gouda is Seeff Properties real estate agent, Jaymor Titus. 

The 138 MW Gouda Wind Farm, opened in September 2015, is situated just outside the town.

References

Populated places in the Drakenstein Local Municipality